The 1982 Asian Basketball Confederation Championship for Women were held in Tokyo, Japan.

Preliminary round

Group A

Group B

Group C

Final round
 The results and the points of the matches between the same teams that were already played during the preliminary round shall be taken into account for the final round.

Classification 7th–9th

Championship

Final standing

Awards

References
 Results
 archive.fiba.com

1982
1982 in women's basketball
women
International women's basketball competitions hosted by Japan
1982 in Japanese sport
April 1982 sports events in Asia
May 1982 sports events in Asia
1982 in Japanese women's sport